Michael Tavares Ribeiro (born February 10, 1980) is a Canadian former professional ice hockey centre. Originally selected by the Montreal Canadiens in the second round, 45th overall, of the 1998 NHL Entry Draft, Ribeiro has played in the NHL for the Canadiens, Dallas Stars, Washington Capitals, Phoenix Coyotes and the Nashville Predators.

Playing career

Amateur
As a youth, Ribeiro played in the 1993 and 1994 Quebec International Pee-Wee Hockey Tournaments with a minor ice hockey team from Hochelaga-Maisonneuve.

Montreal Canadiens, Dallas Stars

Ribeiro was drafted 45th overall by the Montreal Canadiens in the second round of the 1998 NHL Entry Draft. On September 30, 2006, the Canadiens traded Ribeiro and a sixth-round draft pick in 2008 to the Dallas Stars in exchange for Janne Niinimaa and a fifth-round draft pick in 2007.

In the 2006–07 season, Ribeiro led Dallas in points, with 59. On July 12, the Stars signed Ribeiro to a one-year, $2.8 million contract extension for the 2007–08 season.

On January 7, 2008, Ribeiro and the Stars agreed to a new five-year, $25 million contract extension. Ribeiro went on to establish career highs in goals (27), assists (56) and points (83) that season and earned his first NHL All-Star Game appearance.

Although often critiqued for his lack of toughness, the 2008–09 season also saw Ribeiro breakout in the shootout, particularly with highlight reel performances in games against the Los Angeles Kings and the Colorado Avalanche.

Washington Capitals

On June 22, 2012, during the 2012 NHL Entry Draft and in the final year of his contract, Ribeiro was traded to the Washington Capitals in exchange for Cody Eakin and a 2012 second-round draft pick (54th overall). Alongside the likes of Alexander Ovechkin and Nicklas Bäckström on the Washington roster, Ribeiro scored prolifically with the Capitals, averaging over a point-per-game with 49 in 48 games.

Phoenix Coyotes
On July 2, 2013, seeking a long-term deal, the Capitals opted to allow Ribeiro to become an unrestricted free agent. On July 5, the Phoenix Coyotes then signed the free agent Ribeiro to a four-year, $22 million contract with a limited no-movement clause, re-uniting him with his former head coach whilst with the Stars, Dave Tippett. In his first season with the Coyotes in 2013–14, however, Ribeiro failed to reproduce his scoring pace of the previous year, scoring 16 goals and 47 points in 80 games.

Nashville Predators
On June 27, 2014, Ribeiro was bought-out by the Coyotes after only the first year of his four-year contract due to behavioural issues related to alcohol use. Weeks later, on July 15, Ribeiro signed a one-year, $1.05 million contract as an unrestricted free agent with the Nashville Predators.

On July 1, 2015, after a 2014–15 season in which he scored 15 goals and 47 assists for 62 points to finish second on the Predators in scoring, Ribeiro signed a two-year, $7 million contract extension with Nashville, thereby avoiding free agency.

In the second year of his contract extension, Ribeiro struggled to keep up his play, scoring just 4 goals in 46 games before being placed on waivers by the Predators on February 2. After going unclaimed, Ribeiro was assigned to the Milwaukee Admirals, the Predators' AHL affiliate. Ribeiro briefly considered retirement, but ultimately decided to report to the Admirals.

Ribeiro had battled alcoholism throughout his career in the NHL, and amidst reports that he had relapsed, his agent subsequently stated "There is not a single NHL or even European team that has called me to inquire about his services. "

Personal life
Ribeiro has three children (Mikael, Noah and Viktoria) with his wife Tamara. He is of Portuguese descent.

In 2014, Ribeiro faced charges from his former nanny that he forcibly sexually assaulted her at their Virginia residence. In 2017, Ribeiro settled the case out of court.

Career statistics

Regular season and playoffs

International

Awards and honours

References

External links
 

1980 births
Living people
Anglophone Quebec people
Canadian ice hockey centres
Canadian people of Portuguese descent
Dallas Stars players
Espoo Blues players
Fredericton Canadiens players
Hamilton Bulldogs (AHL) players
Ice hockey people from Montreal
Milwaukee Admirals players
Montreal Canadiens draft picks
Montreal Canadiens players
Nashville Predators players
National Hockey League All-Stars
Phoenix Coyotes players
Quebec Citadelles players
Quebec Remparts players
Rouyn-Noranda Huskies players
Washington Capitals players
Canadian expatriate ice hockey players in Finland